Ernest Willett (27 July 1919 – 13 February 1985) was an English footballer who played one game for Port Vale in the English Football League in October 1946.

Career
Willett graduated through the Port Vale youth team to sign as a professional in January 1940. He made his debut at The Old Recreation Ground against Macclesfield Town in a war cup match on 13 April 1946; the match finished goalless. His second game was in the English Football League Third Division South on 5 October 1946, in a 3–0 loss to Bournemouth & Boscombe Athletic at Dean Court. He was not selected again in the 1946–47 season, and he was instead transferred to Cheshire County League side Witton Albion in March 1947. He scored one goal in twelve games in what remained of the 1946–47 season, appeared 45 times in the 1947–48 campaign and scored one goal from five games in the 1948–49 season.

Career statistics

References

Sportspeople from Burslem
English footballers
Association football midfielders
Stoke City F.C. players
Port Vale F.C. players
Witton Albion F.C. players
English Football League players
1919 births
1985 deaths